The second USS Elizabeth (SP-1092) was a United States Navy patrol vessel in commission from 1917 to 1918.

Elizabeth was built as a private motorboat of the same name by the Gulf Fisheries Company at Galveston, Texas, for use as a pleasure craft. In October 1917, the U.S. Navy acquired her from her owner, W. L. Moody Jr. of Galveston, for use as a section patrol boat during World War I. Moody delivered her to the Navy on or about 2 November 1917, and she was commissioned as USS Elizabeth (SP-1092).

Assigned to the 8th Naval District, Elizabeth carried out patrol duties along the United States Gulf Coast for the rest of World War I. She eventually (presumably sometime in 1918) was renamed USS SP-1092, apparently to avoid confusion with another patrol boat, which was in service from 1917 to 1919.

On 15 November 1918, four days after the end of the war, SP-1092 was wrecked at the mouth of the Brazos River, near Freeport, Texas. She was stricken from the Navy Directory the same day.

References

Department of the Navy Naval History and Heritage Command Online Library of Selected Images: Civilian Ships: Elizabeth (American Motor Boat). Served as USS Elizabeth (SP-1092) and USS SP-1092 in 1917–1918
NavSource Online: Section Patrol Craft Photo Archive SP-1092 ex-Elizabeth (SP 1092)

Patrol vessels of the United States Navy
World War I patrol vessels of the United States
Ships built in Galveston, Texas
Maritime incidents in 1918
Shipwrecks of the Texas coast
1900s ships